Ochotnik  is a village in the administrative district of Gmina Masłowice, within Radomsko County, Łódź Voivodeship, in central Poland. It lies approximately 26 kilometres (16 mi) east of Radomsko and 76 km (47 mi) south of the regional capital Łódź.

References

Villages in Radomsko County